Kingship of Christ usually refers to Jesus, whom Christians believe to be the Messiah (Christ), as a king. It may refer to:

 The Catholic doctrine of the Social Kingship of Christ
Intercession of Christ
Kingly office of Christ
Millennialism, the belief that Christ will reign on earth for a millennium 
Session of Christ

See also 
Christ the King
Jesus, King of the Jews
Kingdom of God (Christianity)

Christian terminology